Laura Elizabeth Loomer (born May 21, 1993) is an American far-right and anti-Muslim political activist, white nationalist, conspiracy theorist, and internet personality. She was the Republican nominee to represent Florida's 21st congressional district in the 2020 United States House of Representatives elections, losing to Democrat Lois Frankel.

Loomer has worked as an activist and journalist for several organizations, including Project Veritas, a right-wing group known for producing secretly recorded and deceptively edited undercover audio and video investigations of media organizations and left-leaning groups. She also briefly reported for the Canadian far-right news website The Rebel Media in 2017, and has occasionally reported for the American far-right conspiracy theory and fake news website InfoWars.

Loomer gained notoriety as a result of being banned from numerous social media platforms, payment processors, vehicles for hire, and food delivery mobile apps for various reasons, including violating policies on hate speech and spreading misinformation.  She has also been banned and removed from events, and had press credentials revoked, for harassment and causing disturbances. After her 2018 ban from Twitter, she handcuffed herself to Twitter's headquarters in New York for two hours before police cut through the handcuffs at her request. Loomer was also banned from the March 2019 Conservative Political Action Conference (CPAC) after attempting to heckle reporters and chasing them through the conference.

Early life and education
Loomer and her two brothers were raised in Arizona. She attended Mount Holyoke College, leaving after one semester; she said she felt targeted for being conservative. She transferred to Barry University in Miami Shores, Florida, and graduated in 2015 with a bachelor's degree in broadcast journalism. Loomer is Jewish.

Activities

2015–2017
In March 2015, Loomer used a concealed video camera to record her conversations with Barry University officials, discussing the idea of starting a club called "Sympathetic Students in Support of the Islamic State of Iraq and Syria". The school apparently asked only that the club's name be changed to "Students in Support of the Middle East". James O'Keefe of Project Veritas, a right-wing organization known for producing secretly recorded and deceptively edited undercover audio and video investigations about media organizations and left-leaning groups, released the video of the encounter, alleging that it captured a university official unfazed by the idea of an on-campus organization to support ISIS. Shortly thereafter, the university suspended Loomer for violating the student code of conduct and a professor shown in the video filed criminal charges against her for recording him without his knowledge. At the time, Loomer was an honors student in her senior year and the president of Barry University's Young Republicans Club.

According to a Hillary Clinton campaign official, Loomer and two other women posing as Clinton supporters attempted to "entrap" campaign workers into accepting illegal cash donations in July 2015. The official said the campaign had complied with the law.

Until 2017, Loomer worked for Project Veritas. She reported for the Canadian far-right website The Rebel Media during the summer of 2017, resigning that September. She has also occasionally reported for the American far-right conspiracy theory and fake news website InfoWars.

On November 8, 2016, the day of the U.S. presidential election, Loomer went to a polling station dressed in a burqa and asked for a ballot under the name of Huma Abedin. On June 10, 2017, she gave a speech to a crowd of "anti-sharia" marchers in New York City and condemned "liberals who aligned themselves with sharia law." She put a burqa on the Fearless Girl statue at Bowling Green in lower Manhattan.

Julius Caesar play protest
On June 16, 2017, Loomer disrupted a Shakespeare in the Park presentation of Julius Caesar in New York City by walking on stage during the live performance shortly after the title character was assassinated. The Delacorte Theatre production reimagined Julius Caesar as Donald Trump with a Slovenian-accented actress as his wife, Calpurnia. Before being escorted offstage by security, Loomer shouted, "This is violence against Donald Trump! Stop the normalization of political violence against the right! This is unacceptable!" Loomer was arrested for disorderly conduct and criminal trespassing. Earlier in the week, showings of the play had elicited criticism for depicting women and minorities perpetrating the violent assassination of Trump as U.S. president.

Public Theater New York responded by saying although they are "champions" of the First Amendment, the disruption was caused by "social media". On June 19, Alyssa Rosenberg of The Washington Post wrote that she did not believe Loomer was genuinely offended by the play, but was looking for attention and to collect a $1,000 bounty that alt-right social media personality Mike Cernovich had offered to anyone who disrupted the production. Appearing on the Fox News program Hannity a few days after her arrest, Loomer said she knew that disrupting the play would result in criminal charges against her. During the interview, she objected to the depiction of Caesar in the play and accused the left of "systematically and programmatically" using "free expression as a pretext to incite violence." A "Free Laura" website soliciting donations for her arrest had been purchased by Loomer's employer, Rebel Media owner Ezra Levant, six hours before the play started. Loomer also promoted a crowdfunding page for donations, which received $12,385 from 241 contributors, more money than the normal penalties for the charges she was facing.

2019
On January 14, 2019, Loomer convinced several men she met in a Home Depot parking lot, who she claimed were undocumented, to jump the fence with her at Nancy Pelosi's Napa, California, home. The group set up a tent on Pelosi's lawn to protest immigration before being removed by police. They were not arrested. A few days later, Loomer attempted to interrupt a speaker at the 2019 Women's March in Washington, D.C., appearing onstage to call the Women's March a "Nazi" organization. As she was escorted off by security, she shouted "What about the Jews?" On January 30, 2019, Loomer and others jumped the wall surrounding the California Governor's Mansion in Sacramento. They wore Mexican serapes and sombreros, with one wearing a large false mustache, and said they were protesting Governor Gavin Newsom's stance on immigration. They were arrested, given citations, and released within a few hours. Later that day, the group provoked a confrontation outside a Mexican restaurant in downtown Sacramento, live-streaming the event.

Campaigns for public office

2020
Loomer lost the 2020 United States House of Representatives election to incumbent Democrat Lois Frankel in Florida's 21st congressional district. The district was heavily Democratic, and Loomer's candidacy was considered a long shot. Frankel had represented the district since 2012. Loomer defeated five opponents to win the Republican primary in August 2020, receiving 14,500 votes out of 34,000 cast (43%). President Donald Trump expressed support for Loomer, tweeting after her primary win, "Great going Laura. You have a great chance against a Pelosi puppet!" She also received endorsements from Florida Representative Matt Gaetz and former Trump adviser Roger Stone. The White House later downplayed Trump's support for Loomer and for Congressional candidate Marjorie Taylor Greene, saying, "The president routinely congratulates people who officially get the Republican nomination for Congress, so he does that as a matter of course... He hasn't done a deep dive into the statements by these two particular women." After her primary victory, Twitter and Facebook reiterated that they would not unban her.

2022
In September 2021, Loomer announced her candidacy for Florida's 11th district in 2022. She tried to unseat Republican Rep. Daniel Webster in the primary election. Loomer had initially declared her intent to run again in the 21st district. Backed by the group American Liberty Fund, Loomer was endorsed by Representatives Marjorie Taylor Greene and Paul Gosar, as well as Roger Stone and Michael Flynn. She lost the primary election on August 23, 2022 with 44.2% to Webster's 51.1%, but refused to concede. In a speech election night Loomer said "I'm not conceding because I'm a winner, the reality is our Republican party is broken to its core." Loomer railed against unspecified voter fraud and "big-tech election interference."

Bans and removals 
Loomer has been banned from numerous social media platforms, payment processors, and vehicles for hire and food delivery mobile apps for various reasons, including violating policies on hate speech and spreading misinformation. She has also been banned and removed from events, and had press credentials revoked, for harassment and causing disturbances.

From apps and online platforms 
Blogging platform Medium banned Loomer in February 2017, after expanding its platform policies to ban disinformation and expanding its policies against hate speech. Loomer was banned from both Uber and Lyft in November 2017 after a day-long anti-Muslim , which included tweets about not being able to find a "non Muslim cab or @Uber @lyft driver". Twitter banned Loomer in 2018 for violating its policies against hateful conduct. After the ban, she handcuffed herself to Twitter's headquarters in New York for two hours before police cut through the handcuffs at her request. In February 2019, Loomer was banned from PayPal, GoFundMe, and Venmo. In response, she said that "left wing terrorists and tech tyrants" were "trying to shut [her] down" and that she would "stop at nothing to make sure justice is served for the way Silicon Valley has disenfranchised me, falsely accusing me of being a white supremacist, a Nazi, anti-Muslim, a racist, a bigot, and every other smear in the book." Loomer was one of several right-wing activists banned by Facebook and Instagram in 2019 for using the platforms to spread misinformation and extremism. In May 2021, she said she was banned from the social media app Clubhouse hours after joining.

In December 2022, after Elon Musk bought Twitter, Loomer's previously-banned Twitter account was reinstated.

From events 
Loomer used press credentials to attend the March 2018 trial of Noor Salman, the wife of the perpetrator of the June 2016 Orlando nightclub shooting. Her press credentials were revoked after she harassed Salman's family; she returned to the trial the next day and was removed by a U.S. Marshal. In April 2018, Loomer disrupted an event promoting James Comey's book A Higher Loyalty before being removed from the building by security. In September 2018, she briefly interrupted a House Energy and Commerce Committee hearing. Shouting from the visitor gallery, she accused Twitter CEO Jack Dorsey, who was testifying before the committee, of censoring conservatives on the platform and of attempting to influence elections in favor of Democrats. Representative Billy Long, who was an auctioneer before joining Congress, drowned out Loomer's protest shouts with an auction chant until she was removed from the hearing room.  In October 2018, police escorted Loomer from a campaign event for Andrew Gillum, the Democratic nominee for governor of Florida.

Loomer was banned from the 2019 Conservative Political Action Conference (CPAC) after aggressively confronting reporters, using her press credentials to follow them into a media-only area after they had declined to speak with her. In particular, she heckled CNN reporter Oliver Darcy with questions about internet censorship and social media bans.

On June 4, 2021, Loomer again confronted Dorsey, this time at the Bitcoin 2021 conference, alleging he had censored people and interfered with elections. Loomer was removed from the event.

Lawsuits 
After Loomer was banned by various social media companies, she filed a lawsuit in 2018 against Twitter, Apple, Facebook, and Google. The lawsuit, in which she was represented by right-wing activist lawyer Larry Klayman, alleged that the platforms had collaborated to suppress conservative speech. The case was dismissed at both district and circuit court levels, primarily due to the court's determination that social media companies cannot violate the First Amendment because they are not governmental bodies. In 2021, the Supreme Court declined to hear the case.

After Twitter banned Loomer in 2018, she and her company Illoominate Media filed suit against the Council on American-Islamic Relations (CAIR), claiming it had conspired with Twitter to ban her. The lawsuit was thrown out after a man known for pranking prominent alt-right personalities admitted he had fabricated the rumor that CAIR was behind the ban. In 2020, Loomer lost an appeal of the case, with the U.S. Court of Appeals for the Southern District of Florida ruling that "Loomer and Illoominate offer nothing beyond vague speculation to indicate that CAIR-Florida was involved in the alleged conspiracy". In 2021, a United States Magistrate Judge ordered Loomer to reimburse more than $120,000 in attorney's fees to CAIR.

In 2019, Loomer filed an unsuccessful lawsuit against U.S. Representative Rashida Tlaib, alleging that during the disruption of an August 2018 campaign event by Loomer and others, Tlaib "violently grabbed" Loomer's cellphone while Loomer was questioning her about foreign policy. The Minneapolis Star Tribune reported that the "video of the incident includes audio of Loomer asking Tlaib if she was 'willing to admit... that Hamas is a terrorist organization.

In 2022, Loomer sued Facebook and Twitter, alleging their anti-hate speech policies constitute racketeering.

Views
Loomer has been widely described as far-right, alt-right, or alt-lite. Cultural critic James Wolcott called her a "raging zealot... intent on becoming the agent provocateur." Loomer has denounced the alt-right and publicly repudiated white supremacist Richard B. Spencer, who coined the term, and refused to share a stage with him. She received antisemitic threats and harassment from the alt-right after this dispute. However, Loomer has indicated she supports white nationalism, claiming it is distinct from white supremacy; and that white nationalists "need effective leaders—people who aren't Richard Spencer, people who aren't James Allsup—to effectively convey that message."

Anti-Muslim views
On November 1, 2017, the day after a terrorist attack in New York City, Loomer tweeted that she was late to a conference because she could not find a "non Muslim cab or @Uber @lyft driver". After it became known that the suspect in the attack was a former driver for Uber, she called for the creation of a new ride-sharing company that did not employ Muslims. Her day-long tweetstorm blamed all Muslims for the activities of radical Islamists such as ISIL. Subsequently, both Uber and Lyft announced that she had violated their guidelines and was banned from using their services. She described herself on Twitter at the time as a "#ProudIslamophobe" and called for a complete and permanent ban on Muslims entering the United States.

In August 2018, Loomer disrupted a congressional campaign event for Minnesota Democrat Ilhan Omar, which Rashida Tlaib attended. Loomer shouted questions that implied that Tlaib was antisemitic. In November of that year, Twitter banned Loomer from its platform for violating its rules against hateful behavior. According to Loomer, she was banned for a tweet about Omar in which Loomer called her "anti-Jewish" and a member of a religion in which "homosexuals are oppressed" and women are "abused" and "forced to wear the hijab." A week after the ban, she handcuffed herself to a door at Twitter's New York City headquarters in protest while wearing a yellow "Jude" patch. After approximately two hours, police removed the handcuffs with a bolt cutter at her request. Loomer was not arrested.

In February 2019, Loomer traveled to Minnesota with Jacob Wohl, a right-wing perpetrator of Internet fraud, and Ali Alexander, a far-right activist. The group said they were "investigating" whether Omar had married her brother so that he could obtain U.S. citizenship, a baseless rumor that had circulated in Minnesota politics since 2016. Wohl, Loomer, and Alexander were unable to find any immigration irregularities by Omar. A few weeks later, in March 2019, Wohl and Loomer were ejected from the 2019 CPAC when they attempted to present evidence from their trip to Minnesota. Loomer had previously accosted Omar with the same unsubstantiated allegations at the August 2018 Omar campaign event, the one attended by Tlaib. In 2019, Loomer uploaded a video to Instagram about Omar, blaming her and all Muslims for the September 11 attacks and asserting that "Muslims should not even be allowed to seek positions of political office in this country."

Right Wing Watch reported in February 2019 that donations solicited by Loomer were going to the address of The United West, an organization the Southern Poverty Law Center lists as an anti-Muslim hate group. At that time, PayPal banned Loomer from any further use of their service. The Council on American–Islamic Relations, a Muslim civil rights organization, has  described The United West as Islamophobic.

In 2019, following the white supremacist terrorist attack that killed 51 people at two Mosques in Christchurch, New Zealand, Loomer wrote on the platform Telegram, “Nobody cares about Christchurch. I especially don’t.”

Promotion of conspiracy theories
Loomer has promoted various conspiracy theories, mostly related to mass shootings. She has falsely claimed that school shootings in February 2018 in Parkland, Florida, and in May 2018 in Santa Fe, Texas, were staged, and that the perpetrator of the 2017 Las Vegas shootings was affiliated with ISIS. Loomer claimed on Twitter that crisis actors were used for the Santa Fe school shooting, prompting concerns about the amplification of misleading information and conspiracy theories by troll farms and social bots.

In July 2018, Loomer promoted the false narrative that a man arrested with bomb-making equipment and illegal weapons had been a "leftist antifa terrorist." CNN reported that the man in question appeared to be a conservative based on his Facebook profile.

During the October 2018 United States mail bombing attempts, Loomer tried to spread the conspiracy theory that the bombing attacks were a "false flag" operation orchestrated by Democrats.

White Nationalism 
Loomer has described herself as a nationalist, and called immigrants who refuse to assimilate a threat to American heritage. Asked in 2017 by Haaretz about her views as a Jew participating in an "anti-sharia" event where the neo-Nazi group Identity Evropa was visibly present, Loomer replied, "Oh, this is like an identitarian group. I'm not totally familiar, but I know they believe in preserving white European culture; there is nothing wrong with that, and they are nationalist."

Loomer has described herself as "pro-white nationalism." Loomer called into an Infowars interview with Kanye West to express her support for West's right to free speech, declaring herself "sympathetic" to West. Earlier in the interview, West had praised Adolf Hitler and the Nazi Party. In response to Loomer's defense of him, West told Loomer "[I] love you." In 2022, Loomer spoke at the annual conference of white supremacist publication American Renaissance. She has additionally attended events with white supremacist Nick Fuentes, and has spoken at Fuentes' white nationalist gathering AFPAC. In 2017, Loomer claimed to be dating alt-right activist Tim Gionet, who had tweeted a photoshopped picture of Loomer inside a gas chamber. Gionet denied that the pair were dating. Loomer has also expressed support for Christian nationalism.

COVID-19 
Loomer downplayed the severity of COVID-19, writing in December 2020, "I hope I get COVID just so I can prove to people I've had bouts of food poisoning that are more serious and life-threatening than a hyped-up virus". In September 2021, she said she had become ill with the disease and was battling it with a variety of preparations, including some shown to be ineffective. She announced via Telegram that she was in great pain and requested that people pray for her.

Even after contracting the disease, Loomer continued to maintain that COVID-19 vaccines are "unsafe and ineffective" and said she would refuse to get one in the future.

References 
Citations

Informational notes

External links
 Campaign website

1993 births
21st-century American journalists
21st-century American politicians
21st-century American women politicians
Far-right politicians in the United States
Alt-right activists
American conspiracy theorists
American critics of Islam
American Internet celebrities
Jewish American journalists
Jewish American politicians
American nationalists
American women journalists
American women podcasters
American podcasters
Arizona Republicans
Right-wing populism in the United States
Barry University alumni
Candidates in the 2020 United States elections
Candidates in the 2022 United States House of Representatives elections
Critics of multiculturalism
COVID-19 conspiracy theorists
Discrimination against LGBT people in the United States
Florida Republicans
Living people
Place of birth missing (living people)
New York (state) Republicans
Jewish American people in Florida politics
InfoWars people